Grunden may refer to the following:

Persons with the name
Per Grundén (1922–2011), Swedish singer and actor
Toralf Grunden (fl. 1900s), Swedish Antarctic explorer, namesake of geologic features in Antarctica
Walter E. Grunden, historiographer of the Japanese atomic program

Places with the name
any of several towns or villages in Germany
Grunden Rock, a 15-metre-tall rock near the entrance to Hope Bay, in the Antarctic Peninsula (named for Toralf Grunden, who wintered there in 1902–03)

Other uses
the Danish word for brilliant